NIFC may refer to:

 National Interagency Fire Center
 National Irish Freedom Committee
 North of Ireland FC
 Narodowy Instytut Fryderyka Chopina (English: Fryderyk Chopin Institute)
 Not Issued For Circulation (numismatics: e.g. proof coinage)